The Afterlove is the fifth studio album by the English singer James Blunt, released on 24 March 2017 through Atlantic Records. To promote the album, Blunt embarked on The Afterlove World Tour in August 2017.

Background
On 23 January 2017, Blunt posted a video clip on his Twitter to announce the album, with the caption "Check out my 12 inch..." In the clip, Blunt appeared naked from the waist up in his bathtub, promising to show fans "something huge", with the camera then panning down to him holding a 12-inch copy of the album. Blunt recorded the album between 2015 and 2016 before it was finished in early 2017.

Critical reception

At Metacritic, which assigns a normalised rating out of 100 to reviews from mainstream critics, The Afterlove received an average score of 54 based on 4 reviews. Neil Z. Yeung from AllMusic gave the album a positive four-star review, writing: "The Afterlove is a brave bid for contemporary relevance in 2017, a wonderful step outside his [Blunt's] comfort zone that is more memorable and exciting than much of his output this decade." Ludovic Hunter-Tilney from the Financial Times gave a positive three-star review and called the songs "carefully structured", with "appealing melodies, on-trend chart pop production and A-list collaborators (including Sheeran) [that] attest to Blunt's musical staying power."

Richard Godwin of the London Evening Standard gave a mixed two-star review, summarising that "[t]he self-deprecating singer songwriter has not lost his way with sentiment" and that the album "finds the former soldier renovating his balladry by means of an R'n'B filter and a few tricks learned from his label-mate: judicious use of auto-tune, choppy guitar grooves and disarming honesty." Godwin also called "Bartender" "catchier than the common cold." Rachel Aroesti of The Guardian gave a negative two-star review, calling the album "[s]lightly desperate and actively risible." Although labelling the lyrics "inoffensive", Aroesti went on to write: "with Blunt having adopted a watered-down version of Justin Bieber's asinine tropical house it smacks of a desire to edge on to Radio 1 playlists and into student nights incognito, but only serves to highlight how irritating the sound has become."

Singles
The first single from the album, "Love Me Better", debuted at number 93 on the UK Singles Chart. The second single, "Bartender", was released on 10 March 2017 along with an accompanying music video.

Promotional singles
"Time of Our Lives" was released on 14 February 2017 as a promotional single for Valentine's Day. This was followed by the release of "Make Me Better" on 2 March 2017.

Track listing

Charts

Weekly charts

Year-end charts

Certifications

References

2017 albums
James Blunt albums